The prime minister of Slovakia, officially the Chairman of the government of the Slovak Republic (Slovak: Predseda vlády Slovenskej republiky), commonly referred to in Slovakia as Predseda vlády or informally as Premiér, is the head of the government of the Slovak Republic. Officially, the officeholder is the third highest constitutional official in Slovakia after the President of the republic (appointer) and Chairman of the National Council; in practice, the appointee is the country's leading political figure.

Since the creation of the office in 1969, thirteen persons have served as head of government. Since 1993, when Slovakia gained independence, eight persons have occupied the function. On 1 April 2021, Eduard Heger became the Prime Minister of Slovakia.

History
The office of Prime Minister of Slovakia was established in 1969 by the Constitutional Act on the Czechoslovak Federation. A similar office had existed from 1918 when various officials were presiding over executive bodies governing the Slovak part of Czechoslovakia or the Slovak State respectively. Since 1993, when the independent Slovak Republic was established, there have been six persons to hold the office. Since 2021, the prime minister of Slovakia has been Eduard Heger.

Powers and role

Since Slovakia is a parliamentary republic the prime minister is accountable to the National Council. The Slovak Constitution provides that upon the accession to the office each prime minister must gain and thereafter maintain the confidence of the Parliament. As soon as the prime minister loses the confidence, the president is obliged to dismiss him and designate a new prime minister or entrust the dismissed prime minister to act as a caretaker with limited powers.

The prime minister is the most powerful office in state, since he commands and presides over the government. Although it is not the prime minister but the president who appoints ministers in Cabinet, the president appoints ministers on the advice of the prime minister.

Designated Prime Minister of Slovakia

Designated Prime Minister of Slovakia is an unofficial title for a person who has been entrusted by the president of the Slovak Republic with forming a new government and replacing the outgoing prime minister. This title, as well as the authorization of the president to entrust the designated PM, is not set by an act but is a legal or, more precisely, constitutional tradition. According to this tradition, the president designates a person who has support of the majority of deputies in the National Council.

List of Prime Ministers of Slovakia

Czechoslovak Republic

Autonomous Land of Slovakia (1938–1939)
Jozef Tiso (7 October 1938 – 9 March 1939)

Slovak Republic (1939–1945)
Jozef Tiso (14 March 1939 – 17 October 1939)
Vojtech Tuka (27 October 1939 – 5 September 1944)
Štefan Tiso (5 September 1944 – 4 April 1945)

Czechoslovak Socialist Republic (1969–1990)

Czech and Slovak Federative Republic (1990–1992)

Slovak Republic (1993–present)

Statistics

Slovak Republic (1993–present)

Notes

References

See also
List of prime ministers of Czechoslovakia
List of prime ministers of the Slovak Socialist Republic

Slovakia, List of Prime Ministers of
Government of Slovakia
Political history of Slovakia
 
Prime Ministers
1993 establishments in Slovakia